Orazio is a male given name of Italian origin, derived from the Latin name (nomen) Horatius, from the Roman gens (clan) Horatia. 

People so named include:
Orazio Alfani (c. 1510–1583), Italian painter
Orazio Antinori (1811–1882), Italian explorer and zoologist
Orazio Arancio (born 1967), Italian former rugby union player and current coach and sports director
Orazio Attanasio (born 1959), Italian economist and professor
Orazio Bassani (died 1615), Italian musician and composer
Orazio Benevoli (1605–1672), Italian composer
Orazio Bianchi, Italian Baroque painter
Orazio Borgianni (c. 1575–1616), Italian painter and etcher
Orazio Bruni (born c. 1630), Italian engraver
Orazio Fagone (born 1968), Italian sledge hockey player and former speed skater
Orazio Falconieri (died 1664), Italian nobleman
Orazio Fantasia (born 1995), Australian rules footballer
Orazio Farinati (1559–1616), Italian painter
Orazio Farnese, Duke of Castro (1532–1553), husband of Diane de France
Orazio de Ferrari (1606–1657), Italian painter
Orazio Giovan Battista Ravaschieri Fieschi (died 1645), Prince of Belmonte and patrician of Genoa
Orazio Frezza, 17th-century Italian painter
Orazio Gentileschi (1563–1639), Italian painter
Orazio Giustiniani (1580–1649), Italian Roman Catholic cardinal
Orazio Grassi (1583–1654), Italian mathematician, astronomer and architect
Orazio Costante Grossoni (1867–1952), Italian sculptor
Orazio Ludovisi (1561–1640), Italian nobleman, military commander, patrician of Bologna; brother of Pope Gregory XV
Orazio Mariani (1915–1981), Italian sprinter
Orazio Marinali (1643–1720), Italian sculptor
Orazio Marucchi (1852–1931), Italian archaeologist
Orazio Mochi (1571–1625), Italian sculptor
Orazio Pierozzi (1884–1919), Italian World War I flying ace
Orazio Porta, 16th-century painter
Orazio Satta Puliga (1910–1974), Italian automobile designer 
Orazio Riminaldi (1586–1631), Italian painter
Orazio Russo (born 1973), Italian retired footballer
Orazio Samacchini (1532–1577), Italian painter
Orazio di Santis (fl. 1568–1577), Italian engraver
Orazio Schillaci (born 1966), Italian politician
Orazio Talami (1624–1708), Italian painter
Orazio Torriani (fl. 1602–1657), Italian architect
Orazio Torsellino (1545–1599), Italian historian and author
Orazio Vecchi (died 1605), Italian composer
Orazio Vecellio (c. 1528–1576), Italian painter

See also
D'Orazio
Horace (disambiguation)
Horatio (disambiguation)
Horatius (disambiguation)

Italian masculine given names